Nordik Ruhi (born 24 August 1970) is an Albanian former footballer who played as a defender. He made one appearance for the Albania national team in 1995.

References

External links
 

1970 births
Living people
Albanian footballers
Association football defenders
Albania international footballers
FK Dinamo Tirana players
FK Partizani Tirana players
KF Tirana players
Place of birth missing (living people)